Municipal elections was held in the Indian state of Assam on 6 March 2022; the results were declared on 9 March. The elections is scheduled for 80 urban local bodies. Elections were originally scheduled to be held in  2020, but were delayed because of pandemic.

Schedule

Voter statistics

List of Municipalities ward wise

Parties and Alliances
Following is a list of political parties and alliances which contested in this election:







Voter Turnout

Results

Results By Municipal Board Wise

References 

1. "Elections to 80 municipal boards in Assam on March 6 - The Shillong Times" https://theshillongtimes.com/2022/02/09/elections-to-80-municipal-boards-in-assam-on-march-6/

2. "Assam municipal elections on March 6, ban on road shows, vehicle rallies | Guwahati News - Times of India" https://m.timesofindia.com/city/guwahati/assam-municipal-elections-on-march-6-ban-on-road-shows-vehicle-rallies/amp_articleshow/89453249.cms

3. "Assam BJP Wins 60 Wards Uncontested In Upcoming Municipal Elections, Claims CM Sarma - Sentinelassam" https://www.sentinelassam.com/amp/north-east-india-news/assam-news/assam-bjp-wins-60-wards-uncontested-in-upcoming-municipal-elections-claims-cm-sarma-579409

4. "Assam municipal boards election: Check poll schedule, result date, other details" https://www.livemint.com/news/india/assam-municipal-boards-elections-check-polling-schedule-result-date-other-details/amp-11644396491811.html

5. "Assam: 69.66 per cent voter turnout in Municipal Board Election" https://nenow.in/north-east-news/assam/assam-69-66-per-cent-voter-turnout-in-municipal-board-elections.html

External links
  Assam State Election Commission

Elections in Assam
A